Limbach may refer to:

Places

Austria
Limbach (Burgenland), a village, see Hungarian exonyms (Burgenland)

Germany
Limbach, Baden-Württemberg, a town in the district of Neckar-Odenwald-Kreis
Limbach, Bad Kreuznach, a municipality in Rhineland-Palatinate
, a quarter of Kirkel, Saarland
Limbach, Westerwaldkreis, a community in Rhineland-Palatinate
Limbach, Vogtland, a municipality in Saxony
Limbach-Oberfrohna, a town in the district of Zwickau, Saxony

Slovakia
Limbach, Slovakia, a municipality in Pezinok District, Bratislava Region

Other
 Limbach Flugmotoren, German manufacturer of aircraft engines